Nirvana (Sanskrit: निर्वाण, ;) is "blowing out" or "quenching" of the activities of the worldly mind and its related suffering. Nirvana is the goal of the Buddhist path, and marks the soteriological release from worldly suffering and rebirths in saṃsāra. Nirvana is part of the Third Truth on "cessation of dukkha" in the Four Noble Truths, and the "summum bonum of Buddhism and goal of the Eightfold Path."

In the Buddhist tradition, nirvana has commonly been interpreted as the extinction of the "three fires", or "three poisons", greed (raga), aversion (dvesha) and ignorance (moha). When these fires are extinguished, release from the cycle of rebirth (saṃsāra) is attained.

Nirvana has also been claimed by some scholars to be identical with anatta (non-self) and sunyata (emptiness) states though this is hotly contested by other scholars and practicing monks. In time, with the development of the Buddhist doctrine, other interpretations were given, such as the absence of the weaving (vana) of activity of the mind, the elimination of desire, and escape from the woods, cq. the five skandhas or aggregates.

Buddhist Theravada scholastic tradition identifies two types of nirvana: sopadhishesa-nirvana literally "nirvana with a remainder", attained and maintained during life, and parinirvana or anupadhishesa-nirvana, meaning "nirvana without remainder" or final nirvana, achieved on death, a death which is not followed by a rebirth or reincarnation in (according to Buddhist beliefs) the usual way. The founder of Buddhism, the Buddha, is believed to have reached both these states, the first at his Enlightenment under the Bodhi Tree, and the latter at his death many years later.  Most Mahayana authorities have broadly similar ideas, but prefer the terms "abiding" and "non-abiding nirvana" for the two stages. 

Nirvana, or the liberation from cycles of rebirth, is the highest aim of the Theravada tradition. In the Mahayana tradition, the highest goal is Buddhahood,  in which there is no abiding in nirvana. Buddha helps liberate beings from saṃsāra by teaching the Buddhist path. There is no rebirth for Buddha or people who attain nirvana. But his teachings remain in the world for a certain time as a guidance to attain nirvana.

Meaning and etymology
The origin of the term nirvana is probably pre-Buddhist. It was a more or less central concept among the Jains, the Ajivikas, the Buddhists, and certain Hindu traditions.

It generally describes a state of freedom from suffering and rebirth. The ideas of spiritual liberation using different terminology, is found in ancient texts of non-Buddhist Indian traditions, such as in verse 4.4.6 of the Brihadaranyaka Upanishad of Hinduism.

The term may have been imported into Buddhism with much of its semantic range from these other sramanic movements. However its etymology may not be conclusive for its meaning. Different Buddhist traditions have interpreted the concept in different ways, and the term has had a range of meanings over time.

Extinction and blowing out
One literal interpretation translates nir√vā as "blow out", interpreting nir is a negative, and va as "to blow"., giving a meaning of "blowing out" or "quenching". It is seen to refer to both to the act and the effect of blowing (at something) to put it out, but also the process and outcome of burning out, becoming extinguished.

The term nirvana in the soteriological sense of "blown out, extinguished" state of liberation does not appear in the Vedas nor in the pre-Buddhist Upanishads. According to Collins, "the Buddhists seem to have been the first to call it nirvana."

The term nirvana then became part of an extensive metaphorical structure that was probably established at a very early age in Buddhism. According to Gombrich, the number of three fires alludes to the three fires which a Brahmin had to keep alight, and thereby symbolise life in the world, as a family-man. The meaning of this metaphor was lost in later Buddhism, and other explanations of the word nirvana were sought. Not only passion, hatred and delusion were to be extinguished, but also all cankers (asava) or defilements (khlesa). Later exegetical works developed a whole new set of folk etymological definitions of the word nirvana, using the root vana to refer to "to blow", but re-parsing the word to roots that mean "weaving, sewing", "desire" and "forest or woods":
 vâna, derived from the root word √vā which means "to blow":
 (to) blow (of wind); but also to emit (an odour), be wafted or diffused; nirvana then means "to blow out";
 vāna, derived from the root vana or van which mean "desire",
 nirvana is then explained to mean a state of "without desire, without love, without wish" and one without craving or thirst (taṇhā);
 adding the root √vā which means "to weave or sew"; nirvana is then explained as abandoning the desire which weaves together life after life.
 vāna, derived from the root word vana which also means "woods, forest":
  based on this root, vana has been metaphorically explained by Buddhist scholars as referring to the "forest of defilements", or the five aggregates; nirvana then means "escape from the aggregates", or to be "free from that forest of defilements".

The term nirvana, "to blow out", has also been interpreted as the extinction of the "three fires", or "three poisons", namely of passion or sensuality (raga), aversion or hate (dvesha) and of delusion or ignorance (moha or avidyā).

The "blowing out" does not mean total annihilation, but the extinguishing of a flame. The term nirvana can also be used as a verb: "he or she nirvāṇa-s," or "he or she parinirvānṇa-s" (parinibbāyati).

To unbind
Ṭhānissaro Bhikkhu argues that the term nibbāna was apparently derived etymologically from the negative prefix, nir, plus the root vāṇa, or binding: unbinding, and that the associated adjective is nibbuta: unbound, and the associated verb, nibbuti: to unbind. He and others use the term unbinding for nibbana. Ṭhānissaro argues that the early Buddhist association of 'blowing out' with the term arose in light of the way in which the processes of fire were viewed at that time - that a burning fire was seen as clinging to its fuel in a state of hot agitation, and that when going out the fire let go of its fuel and reached a state of freedom, cooling, and peace.

Cessation of the weaving of the mind
Another interpretation of nirvana is the absence of the weaving (vana) of activity of the mind.

To uncover
Matsumoto Shirō (1950-), of the Critical Buddhism group, stated that the original etymological root of nirvana should be considered not as nir√vā, but as nir√vŗ, to "uncover". According to Matsumoto, the original meaning of nirvana was therefore not "to extinguish" but "to uncover" the atman from that which is anatman (not atman). Swanson stated that some Buddhism scholars questioned whether 'blowing out' and 'extinction' etymologies are consistent with the core doctrines of Buddhism, particularly about anatman (non-self) and pratityasamutpada (causality). They saw a problem that considering nirvana as extinction or liberation presupposes a "self" to be extinguished or liberated. However other Buddhist scholars, such as Takasaki Jikidō, disagreed and called the Matsumoto proposal "too far and leaving nothing that can be called Buddhist".

Relationship with other terms

Release and freedom from suffering; moksha, vimutti
Nirvana is used synonymously with moksha (Sanskrit), also vimoksha, or vimutti (Pali), "release, deliverance from suffering". In the Pali-canon two kinds of vimutti are discerned: 
 Ceto-vimutti, freedom of mind; it is the qualified freedom from suffering, attained through the practice of concentration meditation (samādhi). Vetter translates this as "release of the heart" which means conquering desire thereby attaining a desire-less state of living.
 Pañña-vimutti, freedom through understanding (prajña); it is the final release from suffering and the end of rebirth, attained through the practice of insight meditation (vipassanā).

Ceto-vimutti becomes permanent, only with the attainment of pañña-vimutti. According to Gombrich and other scholars, these may be a later development within the canon, reflecting a growing emphasis in earliest Buddhism on prajña, instead of the liberating practice of dhyana; it may also reflect a successful assimilation of non-Buddhist meditation practices in ancient India into the Buddhist canon. According to Anālayo, the term uttari-vimutti (highest liberation) is also widely used in the early buddhist texts to refer to liberation from the cycle of rebirth.

Relationship with enlightenment and awakening
Peter Harvey has written that Buddha attained enlightenment, or awakening at age c.35, and final nirvana on his death. The Theravada School sees nirvana as being attained in the non-returner stage of the four stages of enlightenment.

Relationship with ecstasy and bliss
Nirvana is not necessarily related to ecstasy or bliss, although some commentators see such experiences as part of nirvana.

Popular Western usage
L. S. Cousins said that in popular usage nirvana was "the goal of Buddhist discipline,... the final removal of the disturbing mental elements which obstruct a peaceful and clear state of mind, together with a state of awakening from the mental sleep which they induce."

Interpretations of the early Buddhist concept

As a cessation event and the end of rebirth 

Most modern scholars such as Rupert Gethin, Richard Gombrich, Donald Lopez and Paul Williams hold that nirvāṇa (nibbana in Pali, also called nibbanadhatu, the property of nibbana), means the 'blowing out' or 'extinguishing' of greed, aversion, and delusion, and that this signifies the permanent cessation of samsara and rebirth.

According to Steven Collins, a synonym widely used for nirvana in early texts is "deathless" or "deathfree" (Pali: amata, sanskrit: amrta) and refers to a condition "where there is no death, because there is also no birth, no coming into existence, nothing made by conditioning, and therefore no time." He also adds that "the most common thing said about nirvana in Buddhist texts is that it is the ending of suffering (dukkha)." Gethin notes, "this is not a 'thing' but an event or experience" that frees one from rebirth in samsara. According to Collins, the term is also widely used as a verb, one therefore "nirvanizes." Gombrich argues that the metaphor used in the texts of flames going out, refers to fires which were kept by priests of Brahmanism, and symbolize life in the world. Nirvana is also called "unconditioned" (asankhata), meaning it is unlike all other conditioned phenomena.

The cycle of rebirth and suffering continues until a being attains nirvana. One requirement for ending this cycle is to extinguish the fires of attachment (raga), aversion (dvesha) and ignorance (moha or avidya). As Bhikkhu Bodhi states "For as long as one is entangled by craving, one remains bound in saṃsāra, the cycle of birth and death; but when all craving has been extirpated, one attains Nibbāna, deliverance from the cycle of birth and death."

According to Donald Swearer, the journey to nirvana is not a journey to a "separate reality" (contra Vedic religion or Jainism), but a move towards calm, equanimity, nonattachment and nonself. In this sense, the soteriological view of early Buddhism is seen as a reaction to earlier Indic metaphysical views. Thomas Kasulis notes that in the early texts, nirvana is often described in negative terms, including “cessation” (nirodha), “the absence of craving” (trsnaksaya), “detachment,” “the absence of delusion,” and “the unconditioned” (asamskrta). He also notes that there is little discussion in the early Buddhist texts about the metaphysical nature of nirvana, since they seem to hold that metaphysical speculation is an obstacle to the goal. Kasulis mentions the Malunkyaputta sutta which denies any view about the existence of the Buddha after his final bodily death, all positions (the Buddha exists after death, does not exist, both or neither) are rejected. Likewise, another sutta (AN II 161) has Sāriputta saying that asking the question "is there anything else?" after the physical death of someone who has attained nirvana is conceptualizing or proliferating (papañca) about that which is without proliferation (appapañcaṃ) and thus a kind of distorted thinking bound up with the self.

In the early texts, the practice of the noble path and the four dhyanas was said to lead to the extinction of the three fires, and then proceed to the cessation of all discursive thoughts and apperceptions, then ceasing all feelings (happiness and sadness). According to Collins, nirvana is associated with a meditative attainment called the 'Cessation of Perception/Ideation and Feeling' (sannavedayitanirodha), also known as the 'Attainment of Cessation' (nirodhasamapatti). In later Buddhism, dhyana practice was deemed sufficient only for the extinguishing of passion and hatred, while delusion was extinguished by insight.

As a metaphysical place or transcendent consciousness 
Peter Harvey has defended the idea that nirvana in the Pali suttas refers to a kind of transformed and transcendent consciousness or discernment (viññana) that has "stopped" (nirodhena). According to Harvey this nirvanic consciousness is said to be "objectless", "infinite" (anantam), "unsupported" (appatiṭṭhita) and "non-manifestive" (anidassana) as well as "beyond time and spatial location". Rune Johansson's The Psychology of Nirvana also argued that nirvana could be seen as a transformed state of mind (citta).

Stanislaw Schayer, a Polish scholar, argued in the 1930s that the Nikayas preserve elements of an archaic form of Buddhism which is close to Brahmanical beliefs, and survived in the Mahayana tradition. Contrary to popular opinion, the Theravada and Mahayana traditions may be "divergent, but equally reliable records of a pre-canonical Buddhism which is now lost forever." The Mahayana tradition may have preserved a very old, "pre-Canonical" and oral Buddhist tradition, which was largely, but not completely, left out of the Theravada-canon. Schayer's view saw nirvana as an immortal, deathless sphere, a transmundane reality or state. Edward Conze had similar ideas about nirvana, citing sources which speak of an eternal and "invisible infinite consciousness, which shines everywhere" as point to the view that nirvana is a kind of Absolute. A similar view was defended by M. Falk, who held that the nirvanic element, as an "essence" or pure consciousness, is immanent within samsara. M. Falk argues that the early Buddhist view of nirvana is that it is an "abode" or "place" of prajña, which is gained by the enlightened. This nirvanic element, as an "essence" or pure consciousness, is immanent within samsara.

A similar view is also defended by C. Lindtner, who argues that in precanonical Buddhism nirvana is:

According to Christian Lindtner, the original and early Buddhist concepts of nirvana were similar to those found in competing Śramaṇa (strivers/ascetics) traditions such as Jainism and Upanishadic Vedism. It was not a psychological idea or purely related to a being's inner world, but a concept described in terms of the world surrounding the being, cosmology and consciousness. All Indian religions, over time, states Lindtner evolved these ideas, internalizing the state but in different ways because early and later Vedanta continued with the metaphysical idea of Brahman and soul, but Buddhism did not. In this view, the canonical Buddhist views on nirvana was a reaction against early (pre-canonical) Buddhism, along with the assumptions of Jainism and the Upanishadic thought on the idea of personal liberation. As a result of this reaction, nirvana came to be seen as a state of mind, instead of a concrete place. Elements of this precanonical Buddhism may have survived the canonisation, and its subsequent filtering out of ideas, and re-appeared in Mahayana Buddhism. According to Lindtner, the existence of multiple, and contradicting ideas, is also reflected in the works of Nagarjuna, who tried to harmonize these different ideas. According to Lindtner, this lead him to taking a "paradoxical" stance, for instance regarding nirvana, rejecting any positive description.

Referring to this view, Alexander Wynne holds that there is no evidence in the Sutta Pitaka that the Buddha held this view, at best it only shows that "some of the early Buddhists were influenced by their Brahminic peers". Wynne concludes that the Buddha rejected the views of the Vedas and that his teachings present a radical departure from these Brahminical beliefs.

Nirvana with and without remainder of fuel

There are two stages in nirvana, one in life, and one final nirvana upon death; the former is imprecise and general, the latter is precise and specific. The nirvana-in-life marks the life of a monk who has attained complete release from desire and suffering but still has a body, name and life. The nirvana-after-death, also called nirvana-without-substrate, is the complete cessation of everything, including consciousness and rebirth. This main distinction is between the extinguishing of the fires during life, and the final "blowing out" at the moment of death:
 Sa-upādisesa-nibbāna (Pali; Sanskrit sopadhiśeṣa-nirvāṇa), "nirvana with remainder", "nirvana with residue." Nirvana is attained during one's life, when the fires are extinguished. There is still the "residue" of the five skandhas, and a "residue of fuel", which however is not "burning". Nirvana-in-this-life is believed to result in a transformed mind with qualities such as happiness, freedom of negative mental states, peacefulness and non-reactiveness.
 An-up ādisesa-nibbāna (Pali; Sanskrit nir-upadhiśeṣa-nirvāṇa), "nirvana without remainder," "nirvana without residue". This is the final nirvana, or parinirvana or "blowing out" at the moment of death, when there is no fuel left.

The classic Pali sutta definitions for these states are as follows:And what, monks, is the Nibbana element with residue remaining? Here, a monk is an arahant, one whose taints are destroyed, who has lived the holy life, done what had to be done, laid down the burden, reached his own goal, utterly destroyed the fetters of existence, one completely liberated through final knowledge. However, his five sense faculties remain unimpaired, by which he still experiences what is agreeable and disagreeable, still feels pleasure and pain. It is the destruction of lust, hatred, and delusion in him that is called the Nibbana element with residue remaining.And what, monks, is the Nibbana element without residue remaining? Here, a monk is an arahant ... one completely liberated through final knowledge. For him, here in this very life, all that is felt, not being delighted in, will become cool right here. That, monks, is called the Nibbana element without residue remaining.Gombrich explains that the five skandhas or aggregates are the bundles of firewood that fuel the three fires. The Buddhist practitioner ought to "drop" these bundles, so that the fires are no longer fueled and "blow out". When this is done, the bundles still remain as long as this life continues, but they are no longer "on fire." Collins notes that the first type, nirvana in this life is also called bodhi (awakening), nirvana of the defilements or kilesa-(pari)nibbana, and arhatship while nirvana after death is also referred to as the nirvana of the Aggregates, khandha-(pari)nibbana.

What happens with one who has reached nirvana after death is an unanswerable question. According to Walpola Rahula, the five aggregates vanish but there does not remain a mere "nothingness."  Rahula's view, states Gombrich, is not accurate summary of the Buddhist thought, and mirrors the Upanishadic thought.

Anatta, Sunyata
Nirvana is also described in Buddhist texts as identical to anatta (anatman, non-self, lack of any self). Anatta means there is no abiding self or soul in any being or a permanent essence in any thing. This interpretation asserts that all reality is of dependent origination and a worldly construction of each human mind, therefore ultimately a delusion or ignorance. In Buddhist thought, this must be overcome, states Martin Southwold, through "the realization of anatta, which is nirvana".

Nirvana in some Buddhist traditions is described as the realization of sunyata (emptiness or nothingness). Madhyamika Buddhist texts call this as the middle point of all dualities (Middle Way), where all subject-object discrimination and polarities disappear, there is no conventional reality, and the only ultimate reality of emptiness is all that remains.

Synonyms and metaphors

A flame which goes out due to lack of fuel
A commonly used metaphor for nirvana is that of a flame which goes out due to lack of fuel:Just as an oil-lamp burns because of oil and wick, but when the oil and wick are exhausted, and no others are supplied, it goes out through lack of fuel (anaharo nibbayati), so the [enlightened] monk … knows that after the break-up of his body, when further life is exhausted, all feelings which are rejoiced in here will become cool.Collins argues that the Buddhist view of awakening reverses the Vedic view and its metaphors. While in Vedic religion, the fire is seen as a metaphor for the good and for life, Buddhist thought uses the metaphor of fire for the three poisons and for suffering. This can be seen in the Adittapariyaya Sutta commonly called "the fire sermon" as well as in other similar early Buddhist texts. The fire sermon describes the end of the "fires" with a refrain which is used throughout the early texts to describe nibbana:Disenchanted, he becomes dispassionate. Through dispassion, he is fully released. With full release, there is the knowledge, 'Fully released.' He discerns that 'Birth is ended, the holy life fulfilled, the task done. There is nothing further for this world.

An end state, where many adverse aspects of experience have ceased
In the Dhammacakkapavattanasutta, the third noble truth of cessation (associated with nirvana) is defined as: "the fading away without remainder and cessation of that same craving, giving it up, relinquishing it, letting it go, not clinging to it."

Steven Collins lists some examples of synonyms used throughout the Pali texts for Nirvana:the end, (the place, state) without corruptions, the truth, the further (shore), the subtle, very hard to see, without decay, firm, not liable to dissolution, incomparable, without differentiation, peaceful, deathless, excellent, auspicious, rest, the destruction of craving, marvellous, without affliction, whose nature is to be free from affliction, nibbana [presumably here in one or more creative etymology,= e.g., non-forest], without trouble, dispassion, purity, freedom, without attachment, the island, shelter (cave), protection, refuge, final end, the subduing of pride (or ‘intoxication’), elimination of thirst, destruction of attachment, cutting off of the round (of rebirth), empty, very hard to obtain, where there is no becoming, without misfortune, where there is nothing made, sorrowfree, without danger, whose nature is to be without danger, profound, hard to see, superior, unexcelled (without superior), unequalled, incomparable, foremost, best, without strife, clean, flawless, stainless, happiness, immeasurable, (a firm) standing point, possessing nothing.

In the Theravada School

Unconditioned
In the Theravada-tradition, nibbāna is regarded as an uncompounded or unconditioned (asankhata) dhamma (phenomenon, event) which is "transmundane", and which is beyond our normal dualistic conceptions. In Theravada Abhidhamma texts like the Vibhanga, nibbana or the asankhata-dhatu (unconditioned element) is defined thus:‘What is the unconditioned element (asankhata dhatu)? It is the cessation of passion, the cessation of hatred and the cessation of delusion.’Furthermore, for the Theravada, nirvana is uniquely the only asankhata dhamma (unconditioned phenomenon) and unlike other schools, they do not recognize different unconditioned phenomena or different types of nirvana (such as the apratistha or non-abiding nirvana of Mahayana). As noted by Thiện Châu, the Theravadins and the Pudgalavadins "remained strictly faithful to the letter of the sutras" and thus held that nirvana is the only unconditioned dhamma, while other schools also posited various asankhata dhammas (such as the Sarvastivadin view that space or akasa was unconditioned).

Stages

The Theravada tradition identifies four progressive stages. The first three lead to favorable rebirths in more pleasant realms of existence, while the last culminates in nirvana as an Arahat who is a fully awakened person. The first three are reborn because they still have some of the fetters, while arhat has abandoned all ten fetters and, upon death will never be reborn in any realm or world, having wholly escaped saṃsāra.

At the start, a monk's mind treats nirvana as an object (nibbanadhatu). This is followed by realizing the insight of three universal lakshana (marks): impermanence (anicca), suffering (dukkha) and nonself (anatman). Thereafter the monastic practice aims at eliminating the ten fetters that lead to rebirth.

According to Thanissaro Bhikkhu, individuals up to the level of non-returning may experience nibbāna as an object of consciousness. Certain contemplations with nibbāna as an object of samādhi lead, if developed, to the level of non-returning. At that point of contemplation, which is reached through a progression of insight, if the meditator realizes that even that state is constructed and therefore impermanent, the fetters are destroyed, arahantship is attained, and nibbāna is realized.

Visuddhimagga
The Theravada exegete Buddhaghosa says, in his Visuddhimagga:It is called nibbana (extinction) because it has gone away from (nikkhanta), has escaped from (nissata), is dissociated from, craving, which has acquired in common usage the name ‘fastening (vana)’ because, by ensuring successive becoming, craving serves as a joining together, a binding together, a lacing together, of the four kinds of generation, five destinies, seven stations of consciousness and nine abodes of being.According to Buddhaghosa, nibbāna is achieved after a long process of committed application to the path of purification (Pali: Vissudhimagga). The Buddha explained that the disciplined way of life he recommended to his students (dhamma-vinaya) is a gradual training extending often over a number of years. To be committed to this path already requires that a seed of wisdom is present in the individual. This wisdom becomes manifest in the experience of awakening (bodhi). Attaining nibbāna, in either the current or some future birth, depends on effort, and is not pre-determined.

In the Visuddhimagga, chapter I.v.6, Buddhaghosa identifies various options within the Pali canon for pursuing a path to nirvana. According to Gombrich, this proliferation of possible paths to liberation reflects later doctrinal developments, and a growing emphasis on insight as the main liberative means, instead of the practice of dhyana.

The mind of the Arahant is nibbāna 
A related idea, which finds no explicit support in the Pali Canon without interpretation, and is the product of contemporary Theravada practice tradition, despite its absence in the Theravada commentaries and Abhidhamma, is that the mind of the arahant is itself nibbāna. The Canon does not support the identification of the "luminous mind" with nirvanic consciousness, though it plays a role in the realization of nirvāṇa. Upon the destruction of the fetters, according to one scholar, "the shining nibbanic consciousness flashes out" of it, "being without object or support, so transcending all limitations."

Modern Theravada views 

K.N. Jayatilleke, a modern Sri Lankan Buddhist philosopher, holds that nirvana must be understood by a careful study of the Pali texts. Jayatilleke argues that the Pali works show that nirvana means 'extinction' as well as 'the highest positive experience of happiness'. Jayatilleke writes that despite the definition of nirvana as 'extinction', this does not mean that it is a kind of annihilation or a state of dormant nonentity, for this contradicts the statements of the Buddha that reject this interpretation. Jayatilleke holds that the early texts clearly proclaim that nothing can be said about the state of the Buddha after paranibbana (the end of his psycho-physical personality) because "we do not have the concepts or words to describe adequately the state of the emancipated person." This transcendent reality which our normal minds cannot grasp is not located in time or space, it is not causally conditioned, and beyond existence and non-existence. Because trying to explain nibbana by means of logic is impossible, the only thing to be done is to explain how to reach it, instead of dwelling on what it "is". Explaining what happens to the Buddha after nibbana is thus said to be an unanswerable.

A similarly apophatic position is also defended by Walpola Rahula, who states that the question of what nirvana is "can never be answered completely and satisfactorily in words, because human language is too poor to express the real nature of the Absolute Truth or Ultimate Reality which is Nirvana." Rahula affirms that nibbana is most often described in negative terms because there is less danger in grasping at these terms, such as "the cessation of continuity and becoming (bhavanirodha)", "the abandoning and destruction of desire and craving for these five aggregates of attachment", and "the extinction of "thirst" (tanhakkhayo)." Rahula also affirms however that nibbana is not a negative or an annihilation, because there is no self to be annihilated and because 'a negative word does not necessarily indicate a negative state'. Rahula also notes that more positive terms are used to describe nibbana such as "freedom" (mutti) and "truth" (sacca). Rahula also agrees that nirvana is unconditioned.

The American Theravada monk Bhikkhu Bodhi has defended the traditional Theravada view which sees nirvana as "a reality transcendent to the entire world of mundane experience, a reality transcendent to all the realms of phenomenal existence."

The Sri Lankan philosopher David Kalupahana has taken a different position, he argues that the Buddha's "main philosophical insight" is the principle of causality (dependent origination) and that this "is operative in all spheres, including the highest state of spiritual development, namely, nirvana." According to Kalupahana "later scholars attempted to distinguish two spheres, one in which causation prevailed and the other which is uncaused. This latter view was, no doubt, the result of a confusion in the meanings of the two terms, sankhata ('compounded') and paticcasamuppanna ('causally conditioned')." Thus, even though nibbana is termed "asankhata" (un-compounded, not-put together) there is no statement in the early texts which say that nirvana is not dependently originated or is uncaused (the term would be appaticcasamuppana). He thus argues that "nirvana is a state where there is 'natural or causal happening' (paticcasamuppada), but not 'organized,' or 'planned' conditioning (sankha-rana)", as well as "a state of perfect mental health (aroga), of perfect happiness (parama sukha), calmness or coolness (sitibhuta), and stability (aneñja), etc. attained in this life, or while one is alive."

Mahasi Sayadaw, one of the most influential 20th century Theravada vipassana teachers, states in his "On the nature of Nibbana" that "nibbana is perfect peace (santi)" and "the complete annihilation of the three cycles of defilement, action, and result of action, which all go to create mind and matter, volitional activities, etc." He further states that for arahants "no new life is formed after his decease-consciousness." Mahasi Sayadaw further states that nibbana is the cessation of the five aggregates which is like "a flame being extinguished". However this doesn't mean that "an arahant as an individual has disappeared" because there is no such thing as an "individual" in an ultimate sense, even though we use this term conventionally. Ultimate however, "there is only a succession of mental and physical phenomena arising and dissolving." For this reason, Mahasi Sayadaw holds that although for an arahant "cessation means the extinction of the successive rise and fall of the aggregates" this is not the view of annihilation (uccheda-diṭṭhi) since there is ultimately no individual to be annihilated. Mahasi further notes that "feeling [vedana] ceases with the parinibbāna of the Arahant" and also that "the cessation of senses is nibbāna" (citing the Pañcattaya Sutta). Mahasi also affirms that even though nibbana is the "cessation of mind, matter, and mental formations" and even the cessation of "formless consciousness", it is not nothing, but it is an "absolute reality" and he also affirms that "the peace of nibbana is real."

Unorthodox interpretations, nibbana as citta, viññana or atta 
In Thai Theravada, as well as among some modern Theravada scholars, there are alternative interpretations which differ from the traditional orthodox Theravada view. These interpretations see nibbana as equivalent in some way with either a special kind of mind (pabhassara citta) or a special consciousness called anidassana viññāṇa, "non-manifest" consciousness which is said to be 'luminous'. In one interpretation, the "luminous consciousness" is identical with nibbana. Others disagree, finding it to be not nibbana itself, but instead to be a kind of consciousness accessible only to arahants.

Some teachers of the Thai forest tradition, such as Ajahn Maha Bua taught an idea called "original mind" which when perfected is said to exist as a separate reality from the world and the aggregates. According to Maha Bua, the indestructible mind or citta is characterized by awareness or knowing, which is intrinsically bright (pabhassaram) and radiant, and though it is tangled or "darkened" in samsara, it is not destroyed. This mind is unconditioned, deathless and an independent reality. According to Bua, this mind is impure, but when it is purified of the defilements, it remains abiding in its own foundation. Maha Bua also publicly argued (in a newspaper in 1972) that one could meet with and discuss the teachings with arahants and Buddhas of the past (and that Ajahn Mun had done so) therefore positing that nibbana is a kind of higher existence. Prayudh Payutto, a modern scholar-monk who is widely seen as the most influential authority on Buddhist doctrine in Thailand, has played a prominent role in arguing against the views of Maha Bua, strictly basing his views on the Pali canon to refute such notions.

Ajahns Pasanno and Amaro, contemporary western monastics in the Thai forest tradition, note that these ideas are rooted in a passage in the Anguttara Nikaya (1.61-62) which mentions a certain "pabhassara citta". Citing another passage from the canon which mentions a "consciousness that is signless, boundless, all-luminous" (called anidassana viññāṇa) they state that this "must mean a knowing of a primordial, transcendent nature."

A related view of nibbana has been defended by the American Thai forest monk Thanissaro Bhikkhu. According to Thanissaro, "non-manifestive consciousness" (anidassana viññāṇa) differs from the kinds of consciousness associated to the six sense media, which have a "surface" that they fall upon and arise in response to. In a liberated individual, this is directly experienced, in a way that is free from any dependence on conditions at all. In Thanissaro's view, the luminous, unsupported consciousness associated with nibbana is directly known by noble ones without the mediation of the mental consciousness factor in dependent co-arising, and is the transcending of all objects of mental consciousness. The British academic Peter Harvey has defended a similar view of nibbana as anidassana viññāṇa.

According to Paul Williams, there is also a trend in modern Thai Theravada that argues that "nirvana is indeed the true Self (Atman; Pali: atta)". This dispute began when the 12th Supreme Patriarch of Thailand published a book of essays in 1939 arguing that while the conditioned world is anatta, nibbana is atta. According to Williams, this interpretation echoes the Mahayana tathāgatagarbha sutras. This position was criticized by Buddhadhasa Bhikkhu, who argued that the not-self (anatta) perspective is what makes Buddhism unique. Fifty years after this dispute, the Dhammakaya Movement also began to teach that nibbana is not anatta, but the "true self" or dhammakaya. According to Williams, this dhammakaya (dharma body) is "a luminous, radiant and clear Buddha figure free of all defilements and situated within the body of the meditator." This view has been strongly criticized as "insulting the Buddha’s teaching" and "showing disrespect to the Pali canon" by Prayudh Payutto (In his The Dhammakaya case) and this has led to fervent debates in Thai Buddhist circles.

Another western monastic in the thai forest tradition, Ajahn Brahmāli, has recently written against all of these views, drawing on a careful study of the Nikāyas. Brahmāli concludes that the "most reasonable interpretation" of final nibbāna is "no more than the cessation of the five khandhas." Brahmāli also notes that there is a kind of samādhi that is attainable only by the awakened and is based on their knowledge of nibbana (but is not nibbana itself), this meditation is what is being referred to by terms such as non-manifest consciousness (anidassana viññāṇa) and unestablished consciousness (appatiṭṭhita viññāṇa).

Bhante Sujato has written extensively to refute this idea as well.

In other Buddhist schools

Sthavira schools 

The later Buddhist Abhidharma schools gave different meaning and interpretations of the term, moving away from the original metaphor of the extinction of the "three fires". The Sarvastivada Abhidharma compendium, the Mahavibhasasastra, says of nirvana: As it is the cessation of defilements (klesanirodha), it is called nirvana. As it is the extinction of the triple fires, it is called nirvana. As it is the tranquility of three characteristics, it is called nirvana. As there is separation (viyoga) from bad odor (durgandha), it is called nirvana. As there is separation from destinies (gati), it is called nirvana. Vana means forest and nir means escape. As it is the escape from the forest of the aggregates, it is called nirvana. Vana means weaving and nir means negation. As there is no weaving, it is called nirvana. In a way that one with thread can easily be woven while one without that cannot be woven, in that way one with action (karma) and defilements (klesa) can easily be woven into life and death while an asaiksa who is without any action and defilements cannot be woven into life and death. That is why it is called nirvana. Vana means new birth and nir means negation. As there is no more new birth, it is called nirvana. Vana means bondage and nir means separation. As it is separation from bondage, it is called nirvana. Vana means all discomforts of life and death and nir means passing beyond. As it passes beyond all discomforts of life and death, it is called nirvana.According to Soonil Hwang, the Sarvastivada school held that there were two kinds of nirodha (extinction), extinction without knowledge (apratisamkhyanirodha) and extinction through knowledge (pratisamkhyanirodha), which is the equivalent of nirvana. In the Sarvastivada Abhidharma, extinction through knowledge was equivalent to nirvana, and was defined by its intrinsic nature (svabhava), ‘all extinction which is disjunction (visamyoga)’. This dharma is defined by the Abhidharmakosha as "a special understanding, the penetration (pratisamkhyana) of suffering and the other noble truths." Soonil explains the Sarvastivada view of nirvana as "the perpetual separation of an impure dharma from a series of aggregates through the antidote, ‘acquisition of disjunction’ (visamyogaprapti)." Because the Sarvastivadins held that all dharmas exist in the three times, they saw the destruction of defilements as impossible and thus "the elimination of a defilement is referred to as a ‘separation’ from the series." Soonil adds:That is to say, the acquisition of the defilement is negated, or technically ‘disjoined’ (visamyoga), through the power of knowledge that terminates the junction between that defilement and the series of aggregates. By reason of this separation, then, there arises ‘the acquisition of disjunction’ (visamyogaprapti) that serves as an antidote (pratipaksa), which henceforward prevents the junction between the defilement and this series. The Sarvastivadins also held that nirvana was a real existent (dravyasat) which perpetually protects a series of dharmas from defilements in the past, present and future. Their interpretation of nirvana became an issue of debate between them and the Sautrantika school. For the Sautrantikas, nirvana "was not a real existent but a mere designation (prajñaptisat) and was non-existence succeeding existence (pascadabhava)." It is something merely spoken of conventionally, without an intrinsic nature (svabhava). The Abhidharmakosha, explaining the Sautrantika view of nirvana, states:The extinction through knowledge is, when latent defilements (anusaya) and life (janman) that have already been produced are extinguished, non-arising of further such by the power of knowledge (pratisamkhya).Thus for the Sautrantikas, nirvana was simply the "non-arising of further latent defilement when all latent defilements that have been produced have already been extinguished."

Meanwhile, the Pudgalavada school interpreted nirvana as the single Absolute truth which constitutes "the negation, absence, cessation of all that constitutes the world in which we live, act and suffer". According to Thiện Châu, for the Pudgalavadins, nirvana is seen as totally different than the compounded realm, since it the uncompounded (asamskrta) realm where no compounded things exist, and it is also beyond reasoning and expression. One of the few surviving Pudgalavada texts defines nirvana as:Absolute truth is the definitive cessation of all activities of speech (vac) and of all thoughts (citta). Activity is bodily action (kayakarman): speech (vac) is that of the voice (vakkarman); thought is that of the mind (manaskarman). If these three (actions) cease definitively, that is absolute truth which is Nirvana.

Comparison of the major Sthavira school positions

Mahāsāṃghika 
According to Andre Bareau, the Mahāsāṃghika school held that the nirvana reached by arhats was fundamentally inferior to that of the Buddhas. Regarding the nirvana reached by the Buddha, they held that his longevity (ayu), his body (rupa, sarira) and divine power (tejas) were infinite, unlimited and supramundane (lokuttara). Therefore, they held to a kind of docetism which posited that Buddhas only appear to be born into the world and thus when they die and enter nirvana, this is only a fiction. In reality, the Buddha remains in the form of a body of enjoyment (sambhogakaya) and continues to create many forms (nirmana) adapted to the different needs of beings in order to teach them through clever means (upaya).

According to Guang Xing, Mahāsāṃghikas held that there were two aspects of a Buddha's attainment: the true Buddha who is omniscient and omnipotent, and the manifested forms through which he liberates sentient beings through his skillful means. For the Mahāsāṃghikas, the historical Gautama Buddha was merely one of these transformation bodies (Skt. nirmāṇakāya).

Bareau also writes that for the Mahāsāṃghika school, only wisdom (prajña) can reach nirvana, not samadhi. Bareau notes that this might be the source of the prajñaparamita sutras.

Regarding the Ekavyāvahārika branch of the Mahāsāṃghikas, Bareau states that both samsara and nirvana were nominal designations (prajñapti) and devoid of any real substance. According to Nalinaksha Dutt, for the Ekavyāvahārika, all dharmas are conventional and thus unreal (even the absolute was held to be contingent or dependent) while for the Lokottaravada branch, worldly dharmas are unreal but supramundane dharmas like nirvana are real.

In Mahayana Buddhism
The Mahāyāna (Great Vehicle) tradition, which promotes the bodhisattva path as the highest spiritual ideal over the goal of arhatship, envisions different views of nirvāṇa than the Nikaya Buddhist schools. Mahāyāna Buddhism is a diverse group of various Buddhist traditions and therefore there is no single unified Mahāyāna view on nirvāṇa. However, it is generally believed that remaining in saṃsāra in order to help other beings is a noble goal for a Mahāyānist. According to Paul Williams, there are at least two conflicting models on the bodhisattva's attitude to nirvāṇa.

The first model seems to be promoted in the Pañcaviṃśatisāhasrikā Prajñāpāramitā Sūtra and it states that a bodhisattva postpones their nirvāṇa until they have saved numerous sentient beings, then, after reaching Buddhahood, a bodhisattva passes on to cessation just like an arhat (and thus ceases to help others). In this model, their only difference to an arhat is that they have spent aeons helping other beings and have become a Buddha to teach the Dharma. This model seems to have been influential in the early period of Indian Buddhism. Etienne Lamotte, in his analysis of the Mahāprajñāpāramitopadeśa, notes that this text also supports the idea that after entering complete nirvāṇa (parinirvāṇa), a bodhisattva is "able to do nothing more for gods or for men" and therefore he seeks to obtain "wisdom similar to but slightly inferior to that of the Buddhas, which allows him to remain for a long time in saṃsāra in order to dedicate himself to salvific activity by many and varied skillful means."

The second model is one which does not teach that one must postpone nirvāṇa. This model eventually developed a comprehensive theory of nirvāṇa taught by the Yogacara school and later Indian Mahāyāna, which states there are at least two kinds of nirvāṇa, the nirvāṇa of an arhat and a superior type of nirvāṇa called apratiṣṭhita (non-abiding).

Apratiṣṭhita nirvāna 

The classic Mahāyāna Yogacara view posits that there are at least two types of nirvana, holding that what is called ''apratiṣṭhita-nirvana'' ("non-abiding", non-localized", "non-fixed") to be the highest nirvana, and more profound than ''pratiṣṭhita-nirvāṇa'', the ‘localized’, lesser nirvana. According to the classic Indian theory, this lesser, abiding nirvana is achieved by followers of the "inferior" vehicle (hinayana) schools which are said to only work towards their own personal liberation. From this perspective, the hinayana path only leads to one's own liberation, either as sravaka (listener, hearer, or disciple) or as pratyekabuddha (solitary realizer).

According to Robert Buswell and Donald Lopez, ''apratiṣṭhita-nirvana'' is the standard Mahāyāna view of the attainment of a Buddha, which enables them to freely return to samsara in order to help sentient beings, while still being in a kind of nirvana. The Mahāyāna path is thus said to aim at a further realization, namely an active Buddhahood that does not dwell in a static nirvana, but out of compassion (karuṇā) engages in enlightened activity to liberate beings for as long as samsara remains. Apratiṣṭhita-nirvana is said to be reached when bodhisattvas eradicate both the afflictive obstructions (klesavarana) and the obstructions to omniscience (jñeyavarana), and is therefore different than the nirvana of arhats, who have eradicated only the former.

According to Alan Sponberg, apratiṣṭhita-nirvana is "a nirvana that is not permanently established in, or bound to, any one realm or sphere of activity". This is contrasted with a kind of nirvana which is "permanently established or fixed (pratiṣṭhita) in the transcendent state of nirvana-without-remainder (nirupadhisesa-nirvana)." According to Sponberg this doctrine developed among Yogacara Buddhists who rejected earlier views which were based on an individual liberation aimed at a transcendent state, separated from the mundane sphere of human existence. Mahayana Buddhists rejected this view as inconsistent with the universalist Mahayana ideal of the salvation of all beings and with the absolutist non-dual Mahayana perspective that did not see an ultimate distinction between samsara and nirvana. Sponberg also notes that the Madhyamika school also had a hand in developing this idea, due to their rejection of dualistic concepts which separated samsara and nirvana and their promotion of a form of liberation which was totally without duality.

Though the idea that Buddhas remain active in the world can be traced back to the Mahasamghika school, the term apratiṣṭhita-nirvana seems to be a Yogacara innovation. According to Gadjin Nagao, the term is likely to be an innovation of the Yogacaras, and possibly of the scholar Asanga (fl. 4th century CE). Sponberg states that this doctrine presents a "Soteriological Innovation in Yogacara Buddhism" which can be found mainly in works of the Yogacara school such as the Sandhinirmocana-sutra, the Lankavatarasutra, the Mahayanasutralamkara, and is most fully worked out in the Mahayana-samgraha of Asanga. In Chapter IX of the samgraha, Asanga presents the classic definition of apratiṣṭhita-nirvana in the context of discussing the severing of mental obstacles (avarana):This severing is the apratiṣṭhita-nirvana of the bodhisattva. It has as its characteristic (laksana) the revolution (paravrtti) of the dual base (asraya) in which one relinquishes all defilements (klesa), but does not abandon the world of death and rebirth (samsara). In his commentary on this passage, Asvabhava (6th century), states that the wisdom which leads to this state is termed non-discriminating cognition (nirvikalpaka-jñana) and he also notes that this state is a union of wisdom (prajña) and compassion (karuna): The bodhisattva dwells in this revolution of the base as if in an immaterial realm (arupyadhatu). On the one hand—with respect to his own personal interests (svakartham)—he is fully endowed with superior wisdom (adhiprajña) and is thus not subject to the afflictions (klesa) while on the other hand—with respect to the interests of other beings (parartham)—he is fully endowed with great compassion (mahakaruna) and thus never ceases to dwell in the world of death and re-birth (samsara).  According to Sponberg, in Yogacara, the Buddha's special wisdom that allows participation in both nirvana and samsara, termed non-discriminating cognition (nirvikalpaka-jñana) has various aspects: a negative aspect which is free from discrimination that binds one to samsara and positive and dynamic aspects which intuitively cognize the Absolute and give a Buddha "access to the Absolute without yielding efficacy in the relative."

Paths to Buddhahood 
Most sutras of the Mahāyāna tradition, states Jan Nattier, present three alternate goals of the path: Arhatship, Pratyekabuddhahood, and Buddhahood. However, according an influential Mahāyāna text called the Lotus Sutra, while the lesser attainment of individual nirvana is taught as a skillful means by the Buddha in order to help beings of lesser capacities; ultimately, the highest and only goal is the attainment of Buddhahood. The Lotus sutra further states that, although these three paths are seemingly taught by Buddhas as separate vehicles (yana), they are really all just skillful ways (upaya) of teaching a single path (ekayana), which is the bodhisattva path to full Buddhahood. Thus, these three separate goals are not really different at all, the 'lesser' paths are actually just clever teaching devices used by Buddhas to get people to practice, eventually though, they will be led to the one and only path of Mahāyāna and full Buddhahood.

The Mahāyāna commentary the Abhisamayalamkara presents the path of the bodhisattva as a progressive formula of Five Paths (pañcamārga). A practitioner on the Five Paths advances through a progression of ten stages, referred to as the bodhisattva bhūmis (grounds or levels).

Omniscience
The end stage practice of the Mahāyāna removes the imprints of delusions, the obstructions to omniscience (sarvākārajñatā), which prevent simultaneous and direct knowledge of all phenomena. Only Buddhas have overcome these obstructions and, therefore, only Buddhas have omniscience knowledge, which refers to the power of a being in some way to have "simultaneous knowledge of all things whatsoever". From the Mahāyāna point of view, an arhat who has achieved the nirvana of the Lesser Vehicle will still have certain subtle obscurations that prevent the arhat from realizing complete omniscience. When these final obscurations are removed, the practitioner will attain apratiṣṭhita-nirvana and achieve full omniscience.

Buddhahood's bodies

Some Mahāyāna traditions see the Buddha in docetic terms, viewing his visible manifestations as projections from its nirvanic state. According to Etienne Lamotte, Buddhas are always and at all times in nirvana, and their corporeal displays of themselves and their Buddhic careers are ultimately illusory. Lamotte writes of the Buddhas:

This doctrine, developed among the Mahāsaṃghikas, where the historical person, Gautama Buddha, was one of these transformation bodies (Skt. nirmāṇakāya), while the essential Buddha is equated with the transcendental Buddha called dharmakāya. In Mahāyāna, this eventually developed into the doctrine of the "Three Bodies" of the Buddha (Trikaya). This doctrine is interpreted in different ways by the different Mahāyāna traditions. According to Reginald Ray, it is "the body of reality itself, without specific, delimited form, wherein the Buddha is identified with the spiritually charged nature of everything that is."

Buddha-nature

An alternative idea of Mahāyāna nirvana is found in the Tathāgatagarbha sūtras. The title itself means a garbha (womb, matrix, seed) containing Tathagata (Buddha). These Sutras suggest, states Paul Williams, that 'all sentient beings contain a Tathagata' as their 'essence, core or essential inner nature'. The tathāgatagarbha doctrine (also called buddhadhatu, buddha-nature), at its earliest probably appeared about the later part of the 3rd century CE, and is verifiable in Chinese translations of 1st millennium CE. Most scholars consider the tathāgatagarbha doctrine of an 'essential nature' in every living being is equivalent to 'Self', and it contradicts the "no self" (or no soul, no atman, anatta) doctrines in a vast majority of Buddhist texts, leading scholars to posit that the Tathagatagarbha Sutras were written to promote Buddhism to non-Buddhists. The Mahāyāna tradition thus often discusses nirvana with its concept of the tathāgatagarbha, the innate presence of Buddhahood. According to Alex Wayman, Buddha nature has its roots in the idea of an innately pure luminous mind (prabhasvara citta,) "which is only adventitiously covered over by defilements (agantukaklesa)" lead to the development of the concept of Buddha-nature, the idea that Buddha-hood is already innate, but not recognised.

The tathāgatagarbha has numerous interpretations in the various schools of Mahāyāna and Vajrayana Buddhism. Indian Madhyamaka philosophers generally interpreted the theory as a description of emptiness and as a non implicative negation (a negation which leaves nothing un-negated). According to Karl Brunnholzl, early Indian Yogacaras like Asanga and Vasubandhu referred to the term as "nothing but suchness in the sense of twofold identitylessness". However some later Yogacarins like Ratnakarasanti considered it "equivalent to naturally luminous mind, nondual self-awareness."

The debate as to whether tathāgatagarbha was just a way to refer to emptiness or whether it referred to some kind of mind or consciousness also resumed in Chinese Buddhism, with some Chinese Yogacarins, like Fazang and Ratnamati supporting the idea that it was an eternal non-dual mind, while Chinese Madhyamikas like Jizang rejecting this view and seeing tathāgatagarbha as emptiness and "the middle way."

In some Tantric Buddhist texts such as the Samputa Tantra, nirvana is described as purified, non-dualistic 'superior mind'.

In Tibetan Buddhist philosophy, the debate continues to this day. There are those like the Gelug school, who argue that tathāgatagarbha is just emptiness (described either as dharmadhatu, the nature of phenomena, or a nonimplicative negation). Then there are those who see it as the non-dual union of the mind's unconditioned emptiness and conditioned lucidity (the view of Gorampa of the Sakya school). Others such as the Jonang school and some Kagyu figures, see tathāgatagarbha as a kind of Absolute which "is empty of adventitious defilements which are intrinsically other than it, but is not empty of its own inherent existence".

Mahāparinirvāṇa Sūtra 
According to some scholars, the language used in the tathāgatagarbha genre of sutras can be seen as an attempt to state orthodox Buddhist teachings of dependent origination using positive language. Kosho Yamamoto translates the explanation of nirvana in the Mahāyāna Mahāparinirvāṇa Sūtra (c. 100-220 CE) as follows: 

In the Mahāparinirvāṇa Sūtra, the Buddha speak of four attributes which make up nirvana. Writing on this Mahayana understanding of nirvana, William Edward Soothill and Lewis Hodous state:

See also
 Ataraxia
 Bodhi
 Enlightenment (religious)
 Moksha
 Nibbāna: The Mind Stilled
 Nirvana
 Parinirvana
 Satori
 Śūnyatā

Notes

Further notes on "different paths"

Quotes

Further notes on quotes

References

Sources

Printed sources

 
 
 
 
 
 
 
 
 
 
 
 
 
 
 
 
 
 
 
 
 
 
 
 
 
 
 
 
 
 
 
 
 
 
 
 
 
 
 
 
 
 
 
 
 
 
 
 
 
 
 
 
 
 
 
 
 
 
 
 
 
 
 
 
 
 
 
 
 
 
 
 
 
 
 
 
 
 
 
 
 
 
 
 
 
 
  Via Google Books.

Web-sources

Further reading
 Ajahn Brahm, "Mindfulness, Bliss, and Beyond: A Meditator's Handbook" (Wisdom Publications 2006) Part II.
 Katukurunde Nanananda, "Nibbana – The Mind Stilled (Vol. I-VII)" (Dharma Grantha Mudrana Bharaya, 2012).
 Ajahn Pasanno & Ajahn Amaro, "The Island : An Anthology of the Buddha's Teachings on Nibbana" (Abhayagiri Publication 2022).
 Kawamura, Bodhisattva Doctrine in Buddhism, Wilfrid Laurier University Press, 1981, pp. 11.
 
 Yogi Kanna, "Nirvana: Absolute Freedom" (Kamath Publishing; 2011) 198 pages.
 Steven Collins. Nirvana: Concept, Imagery, Narrative  (Cambridge University Press; 2010) 204 pages.

External links

 Buddhism for Beginners, "What is nirvana?"

Buddhist philosophical concepts
Buddhist terminology